Ilaria is an Italian female given name, equivalent to the English names Hilary or Hillary. Ilaria is derived from the Latin hilarius meaning "cheerful", from hilaris, "cheerful, merry". Ilaria was the eighth most popular name for Italian baby girls born in 2006. Notable people with the name include:

Ilaria Alpi (1961–1994), Italian journalist
Ilaria Arrighetti (born 1993), Italian rugby player 
Ilaria Bianchi (born 1990), Italian swimmer
Ilaria Bianco (born 1980), Italian fencer
Ilaria Caprioglio (born 1969), Italian politician
Ilaria D'Amico (born 1973), Italian television presenter
Ilaria del Carretto (1379–1405), Italian noblewoman
Ilaria Fontana (born 1984), Italian politician
Ilaria Graziano (born 1985), Italian singer
Ilaria Käslin (born 1997), Swiss gymnast
Ilaria Mauro (born 1988), Italian football player
Ilaria Occhini (1934–2019), Italian actress
Ilaria Pascucci, Italian astrophysicist
Ilaria Spada (born 1981, Italian actress

See also
Hilary (name)

References

Italian feminine given names